Plutonium-240 ( or Pu-240) is an isotope of plutonium formed when plutonium-239 captures a neutron. The detection of its spontaneous fission led to its discovery in 1944 at Los Alamos and had important consequences for the Manhattan Project.

240Pu undergoes spontaneous fission as a secondary decay mode at a small but significant rate. The presence of 240Pu limits plutonium's use in a nuclear bomb, because the neutron flux from spontaneous fission initiates the chain reaction prematurely, causing an early release of energy that physically disperses the core before full implosion is reached.
It decays by alpha emission to uranium-236.

Nuclear properties 
About 62% to 73% of the time when 239Pu captures a neutron, it undergoes fission; the remainder of the time, it forms 240Pu. The longer a nuclear fuel element remains in a nuclear reactor, the greater the relative percentage of 240Pu in the fuel becomes.

The isotope 240Pu has about the same thermal neutron capture cross section as 239Pu ( vs.  barns), but only a tiny thermal neutron fission cross section (0.064 barns). When the isotope 240Pu captures a neutron, it is about 4500 times more likely to become plutonium-241 than to fission. In general, isotopes of odd mass numbers are more likely to absorb a neutron, and can undergo fission upon neutron absorption more easily than isotopes of even mass number. Thus, even mass isotopes tend to accumulate, especially in a thermal reactor.

Nuclear weapons 
The inevitable presence of some 240Pu in a plutonium-based nuclear warhead core complicates its design, and pure 239Pu is considered optimal. This is for a few reasons:

 240Pu has a high rate of spontaneous fission. A single stray neutron that is introduced while the core is supercritical will cause it to detonate almost immediately, even before it has been crushed to an optimal configuration. The presence of 240Pu would thus randomly cause fizzles, with an explosive yield well below the potential yield.
 Isotopes besides 239Pu release significantly more radiation, which complicates its handling by workers.
 Isotopes besides 239Pu produce more decay heat, which can cause phase change distortions of the precision core if allowed to build up.

The spontaneous fission problem was extensively studied by the scientists of the Manhattan Project during World War II. It blocked the use of plutonium in gun-type nuclear weapons in which the assembly of fissile material into its optimal supercritical mass configuration can take up to a millisecond to complete, and made it necessary to develop implosion-style weapons where the assembly occurs in a few microseconds. Even with this design, it was estimated in advance of the Trinity test that 240Pu impurity would cause a 12% chance of the explosion failing to reach its maximum yield.

Such rapid fuel cycles are highly impractical for civilian power reactors and are normally only carried out with dedicated weapons plutonium production reactors. Plutonium from spent civilian power reactor fuel typically has under 70% 239Pu and around 26% , the rest being made up of other plutonium isotopes, making it more difficult to use it for the manufacturing of nuclear weapons. For nuclear weapon designs introduced after the 1940s, however, there has been considerable debate over the degree to which  poses a barrier for weapons construction; see the article Reactor-grade plutonium.

See also 
 Burnup
 Isotopes of plutonium

References

External links 
NLM Hazardous Substances Databank – Plutonium, Radioactive

Actinides
Isotopes of plutonium
Fertile materials